The Purisima Creek Redwoods Open Space Preserve is located on the western slopes of historic Kings Mountain in Woodside, California. This  preserve was established with a $2 million gift from the Save the Redwoods League.

Purisima Creek and several of its tributaries flow through the preserve.

The main entrance for the Purisima Open Space is off the Skyline Boulevard section of State Route 35. The park is notable for its tall coastal redwoods, along with coastal scrub and hardwood forests of tanoak, madrones, and Douglas firs.

The popular Redwood Trail is wheelchair accessible. Like many parks in California, dogs are not allowed. The preserve is home to many species of animals, including bobcats, mountain lions, coyotes and rabbits.

Photo gallery

See also

References
Openspace.org: Purisima Creek Open Space Preserve
Openspace.org: homepage
 Save the Redwoods League

Protected areas of San Mateo County, California
Midpeninsula Regional Open Space District
Nature reserves in California
Coast redwood groves
Santa Cruz Mountains
Bay Area Ridge Trail